Gorakhpur is a village in Fatehabad district of Haryana, India.

References

Villages in Fatehabad district